Walking Proof is the fourth studio album by American singer-songwriter Lilly Hiatt. It was released on March 27, 2020, under New West Records.

Critical reception
Walking Proof was met with universal acclaim reviews from critics. At Metacritic, which assigns a weighted average rating out of 100 to reviews from mainstream publications, this release received an average score of 85, based on 7 reviews.

Accolades

Track listing

Charts

References

2020 albums
New West Records albums